Igor Mihajlovski (born December 24, 1973) is a Macedonian former professional basketball player and currently assistant coach of Rabotnički.

Playing career
Mihajlovski has played with: KK Kumanovo, KK Partizan, KK MZT Aerodrom, KK Rabotnički, F.C. Porto, S.C. Lusitânia and Rogla Zrece. He won the Macedonian First League and Macedonian Basketball Cup with KK Rabotnički and KK MZT Aerodrom. With KK Partizan, he won the Euroleague title in 1992, national Championship and national Cup. He also helped his team to win the 1991–92 Yugoslav First Basketball League and Yugoslav Basketball Cup. As a member of the senior Macedonia national basketball team, he played at the EuroBasket 1999.

Coaching career
Mihajlovski began his coaching career with the KK Mihajlovski in 2009. In 2014 until the beginning of 2015, Mihajlovski coached KK Kumanovo.

Notes

External links

 

1973 births
Living people
Sportspeople from Kumanovo
Macedonian basketball coaches
KK Borac Čačak players
KK MZT Skopje players
KK Partizan players
KK Rabotnički players
FC Porto basketball players
Forwards (basketball)